Diamond Hill or Bengooria is an isolated peak overlooking the village of Letterfrack, in the northwest corner of the Twelve Bens in Connemara National Park in County Galway, Ireland. At only , it does not rank as an Arderin, or a Vandeleur-Lynam; however, it has the prominence to rank as a Marilyn. 

Diamond Hill lies just west of Knockbrack and the small massif of Benbrack, and looks into the Polladirk valley, around which several major Bens are located. Despite its moderate size and isolation, compared to the nearby Twelve Bens, Diamond Hill is a popular peak due to its paths and boarded mountain trail, and relative ease of access, together with views of the core Twelve Bens range, and western Connemara.

Naming
According to Irish academic Paul Tempan, "Ghuaire" most likely refers to Guaire Aidne mac Colmáin (died 663), one of the Kings of Connacht and a member of the Ui Fiachrach Aidhne. Guaire was renowned for his hospitality and generosity and was known as "Guaire of the extended hand", and is the title character in W.B. Yeats’ play, The King’s Threshold. He is also associated with Dunguaire Castle, near the village of Kinvara.

Tempan also notes that Diamond Hill is also known as "Bengooria", being an anglicised version of its Irish name, as well as "Benhoowirra", an alternative anglicisation.  The Discovery Map spells the name as "Diomond Hill", however, Tempan notes that this is not the locally accepted spelling (being "Diamond"), and relates to the glitter of the quartz crystals on the mountain.

Geography 

Diamond Hill is an isolated peak of the Twelve Bens, which lies in the north-west corner of the range.

To the north of Diamond Hill is Kylemore Lough (and Kylemore Abbey), and across the Lough is the massif of Garraun, which is part of the wider Twelve Bens/Garraun Complex Special Area of Conservation.  To the west of Diamond Hill is the Ballinakill harbour (and weather permitting, views to the isles of Inishboffin and Inishark), and to the south are the western boglands and dotted lakes of Connemara. 

Hill walking 
Diamond Hill is popular for its accessibility and panoramic views, only ranking behind Croagh Patrick for footfall, and attracts both Irish walkers and foreign tourists.  The mountain was closed to climbing in 2002 due to severe erosion but was re-opened in December 2005 after the completion of a Euro 1.4 million wooden boardwalk and stone path trail that would limit further erosion.

The most popular route is the 7-kilometre 2.5-hour round-trip trail that starts and ends at the National Park visitor centre in Letterfrack, and does a loop over the summit ridge and back to the main trail; it does not require any special hiking ability and the trail is well marked, with pathways and boardwalks over bog sections. The trail splits into a Lower Diamond Hill Walk (3 km long loop), and an Upper Diamond Hill Walk (3.7 km long loop) which reaches the summit.

Gallery

Bibliography

See also

Twelve Bens
Mweelrea, major range in Killary Harbour
Maumturks, major range in Connemara
Lists of mountains in Ireland
List of Marilyns in the British Isles

References

External links
MountainViews: The Irish Mountain Website, Diamond Hill
MountainViews: Irish Online Mountain Database
The Database of British and Irish Hills , the largest database of British Isles mountains ("DoBIH")
Hill Bagging UK & Ireland, the searchable interface for the DoBIH

Marilyns of Ireland
Mountains and hills of County Galway
Geography of County Galway
Mountains under 1000 metres